Caroline Hyde is a British journalist specialising in business and technology news. She currently co-anchors "Bloomberg Markets: The Close" show from New York. Prior to that she anchored Bloomberg Technology from San Francisco, and was the Berlin-based chief correspondent for Bloomberg Television, covering European business and technology since 2011 and anchoring the markets and investment show The European Open every morning.

Early life 
Hyde studied at Oxford University and has a masters in Politics, Philosophy and Economics. Upon graduation Hyde worked in public relations for London's Moorgate Group, where she was a debt market specialist, managing campaigns for clients including Standard & Poor's and Lloyds Banking Group.

Bloomberg 
Hyde joined Bloomberg in 2008 to cover the European debt markets for Bloomberg News as a corporate finance reporter, focusing on company loans and bonds as well as sovereign debt. She covered the freeze in the European loan market following the collapse of Lehman Brothers and the unravelling of the European sovereign debt crisis, as well as breaking news on the sales and performance of government bonds from Greece ahead of its bailout.

Moving to TV in 2011, she has interviewed economic leaders and political figures such as Ford Chairman Bill Ford,  Unilever CEO Paul Polman, WPP CEO Sir Martin Sorrell, EasyJet CEO Carolyn McCall, Secretary General of the OECD José Ángel Gurría.

In May 2016, she anchored On the Move with Guy Johnson from Berlin and has interviewed many important world figures including Volkswagen CEO Matthias Müller, German presidential candidate Martin Schulz and Angela Merkel's Chief of Staff Peter Altmaier and Argentinian President Mauricio Macri.

From December 2016 until May 2017, she anchored Bloomberg Technology in San Francisco while regular host Emily Chang was on maternity leave. She continues as the European Technology and Media presenter on Bloomberg Television. Hyde has interviewed technology leaders including Microsoft CEO  Satya Nadella, IBM CEO Ginni Rometty, Airbnb Founder Nathan Blecharczyk, Salesforce CEO Marc Benioff, Dropbox CEO Drew Houston, inventor of the World Wide Web Tim Berners-Lee and WhatsApp CEO Jan Koum.

Awards 
Shortlisted for Woman of the Future award in media in 2016.

External interests 
Hyde is a supporter of Broadminded, a women's professional network that organises inspiring talks, practical advice and an environment where women can encourage and learn from each other.

Personal life 
On 21 May 2016, Hyde married Ben Floyd.

References

External links 
Caroline Hyde's page at Bloomberg.com
Caroline Hyde's Website 

Living people
British journalists
British television presenters
British television journalists
British women journalists
Bloomberg L.P. people
British women television journalists
Writers from London
Alumni of the University of Oxford
1984 births
British women television presenters